Hillbilly Blitzkrieg is a 1942 American comedy film directed by Roy Mack that was a sequel to Private Snuffy Smith. The film is also known as Enemy Round-Up (American TV title).

Plot

Nazi Spies Mistake Snuffy Smith's moonshine for a new secret rocket fuel and try to steal the "formula."

Cast
Bud Duncan as Pvt. Snuffy Smith
Edgar Kennedy as Sgt. Homer Gatling
Cliff Nazarro as Barney Google
Lucien Littlefield as Prof. Waldo James
Doris Linden as Julie James, Waldo's Daughter
Alan Baldwin as Cpl. Jim Bruce
Jimmie Dodd as Missouri, Army Private
Frank Austin as Luke
Nicolle Andre as Eliza Murdock aka Leni the Nazi
Manart Kippen as Soldier
Jerry Jerome as Boller, Leni's Henchman
Jack Carr as Hertle, Leni's Henchman
Teddy Mangean as Dinky

External links

1942 films
1942 romantic comedy films
American war films
American black-and-white films
Monogram Pictures films
Films based on comic strips
Live-action films based on comics
American romantic comedy films
Military humor in film
Films directed by Roy Mack
1940s English-language films
1940s American films